The primary and fundamental statement of laws in the Russian Federation is the Constitution of the Russian Federation.

Hierarchy

Constitutionism
Adopted by national referendum on 12 December 1993 with 54.5% of the vote, the Constitution took effect on the day it was published – 25 December of the same year. It set out the fundamentals of government as well as proclaiming the rule of law, the ideological neutrality of the state, political pluralism, competitive elections and a separation of power, guaranteeing fundamental human rights to the Russian people. The Constitution establishes a semi-presidential system that encompasses strong executive power and increased independence for the president. Since its adoption in a 1993 referendum the Russian Constitution is considered to be the supreme law of the land. Article 15 of the Constitution reads that it "shall have supreme legal force and have direct effect, and shall be applicable throughout the entire territory of the Russian Federation."  Courts are guided by the Constitution and it trumps federal and local laws.

Amendments
Few amendments have been made to the Constitution since its adoption. The most significant of these was made in 2008. It concerned the term of office to be held by the President of the Russian Federation, which was increased from four to six years.

Presidential System of the Russian Federation 
After the dissolution of the Soviet Union, the Russian Federation came into being as an independent state in 1991 and it is described as a "democratic, federal, rule-based republic" in its constitution which is adopted in 1993, includes many universal principles such as human rights and freedoms, free elections, political and ideological pluralism and judicial independence. According to the Constitution of Russia, the President of Russia is head of the state, and of a multi-party system with executive power exercised by the government, headed by the Prime Minister, who is appointed by the President with the parliament's approval. Legislative power is vested in the two houses of the Federal Assembly of the Russian Federation, while the President and the government issue numerous legally binding by-laws. However, even some academics, who accept that Russia has a constitutional semi-presidential model, describe the system as "presidential" and even "super presidential" due to the strong and central position of the president.

Constitutional laws
Constitutional laws cannot become part of the constitution or amend parts of it absent a special legal act on constitutional amendment. They are typically enacted in important areas of constitutional law, such as Article 56 which allows for the passage of the constitutional laws necessitated by a state of emergency

Statutes
Statutes are the predominant legal source of Russian law, and may only be enacted through the legislative process. Codes are the basis for law on a matter, and they are usually supplemented with legislation to develop certain provisions. There are gaps in some of the codes, but even still the judges will find a basis for deciding the case in a given code. Codes are interpreted flexibly, and interpretation may be based on enumeration of "general principles" of the codes. General principles are usually articulated at the beginning of the codes in the first chapter to outline the reason for the legislation. Reasoning by analogy is also allowed.

The Russian Civil Code is the "constitution" of the market economy, and is special in the hierarchy of codes, since it will supplant contradictory text in other codes. New codes and laws supersede old ones, unless a statute expressly preserves the old law.

Sub-laws

Presidential decrees and directives
The President has power to issue normative and non-normative decrees, provided they do not contravene the constitution and federal laws. "On the basis and for the sake of implementation of the Constitution of the Russian Federation, federal laws, normative decrees of the President of the Russian Federation" Government may also issue directives having "normative" character.

Agency regulations
Agencies may enact regulations through their general competency, but these are limited to the extent of the constitution and relevant codes. If these limits are not strictly defined, then the president may use agencies to get around the legislative process. Consequently, agencies may have their powers limited by statutes. The Civil Code purposely authorizes supplementary rules by "statute" rather than the broader term "legislation" which could encompass other secondary law.

Judicial decisions, judicial practice and explanations of supreme courts
Russia is a civil law country; and, strictly speaking, decisions rendered by courts are not binding on other courts. However, the lower courts generally follow the principles established by the supreme courts. Moreover, according to Art.308.8 of the Code of Procedure in Commercial Courts, the Supreme Court can set aside a decision of a lower court on the grounds that this decision contravenes uniformity in interpretation of law as established by case law. In practice, but not in theory, precedents of the higher courts are becoming an important Russian law.

Judicial explanations of law
The Russian Supreme Court have no authority to issue general "explanations" of the substantive law and procedural issues, absent a relevant "case or controversy" in front of them. Legal scholars also take part in these discussions, and the opinions of the judges and commentators are published and used as persuasive authority. This process is somewhat analogous to the discussion that scholars take in American Law Reports or in law reviews. The judges and scholars may codify what is practice, or more importantly address new issues of law to the lower courts and instruct them how to interpret these issues. The texts of the explanations of the law are published, and cited by many courts. In contrast, only selected judicial opinions are published. It is not clear which explanations are binding to lower courts, as there is a tension between the Constitution and federal law versus guiding explanatory principles. Still, lower courts that ignore relevant explanations will probably get reversed.

Judicial review of laws for constitutionality by the constitutional court
Judicial Review allows courts to declare unconstitutional laws void. Constitutional Courts are therefore negative legislators. The interpretations of the constitution in the decisions of the Constitutional Court are also authoritative and binding on the political branches. The ordinary or lower courts may also apply judicial review. Courts of general jurisdiction may decline to apply (1) any law that violates the Constitution and (2) any normative regulations, in particular subordinate regulations that contravene statutes. The Supreme Court of the Russian Federation has jurisdiction to determine the constitutionality of regulations issued by government agencies. The Supreme Court has held that lower courts must evaluate the contents of applicable laws or other normative acts for their conformity to the constitution, and to apply the constitution where they conflict.

Other sources

USSR legislation
USSR legislation fills gaps as the new system is being put in place, and is purely transitional until the Russian parliament can add new laws. It cannot contradict legislative acts of RF.

Analogy
Judges often reason by analogy, using the general principles of the law the codes to interpret provisions broadly.

Legal consciousness, natural law, good faith and general principles
Judges don't rely on natural law, but rather legal positivism combined with general principles of law. They may rely on "the requirements of good faith, reasonableness, and justice since Civil Code and other codes tell specific principles within the code. Other principles are equity and fairness, general principles of law, etc.

Custom
The Russian Civil Code explicitly mentions custom as a separate source of law. Traditions may establish rules of decision where there is no dispositive language in statute or other written law.

Academic commentary
Individual scholars may be influential by drafting legislation or debating proposed legislation. Unlike in some civil-law systems, academic treatises or learned commentary is not considered a separate source of law or cited by judges, but judges and attorney rely on it for their arguments.

International law
All international law and the international treaties of the Russian Federation are part of Russian domestic legal system. Domestic law gives way to international law according to Article 15 of the Constitution. The Constitutional Court has the greatest expertise in applying international law.

Type of legal system
During the Soviet period, Russian law was considered to be socialist law. Since the fall of the Soviet Union that is no longer the case, and most scholars have classified the Russian legal system as a civil law system. However, there are problems with this new classification (similar to the ones that plagued Russia's classification as a socialist law country). Some legal branches could be considered as the mix of civil law and common law. For, example civil procedural law is considered by Dmitry Maleshin as a mix of civil law and common law.

Publications
The Rossiyskaya Gazeta is the daily newspaper of record which includes the official decrees, statements and documents of state bodies such as the promulgation of newly approved laws, presidential decrees, and governmental orders.

Legal education

Legal education has traditionally begun with the specialist degree in law.

See also
 Institute of State and Law
 Russian legal history
 Old Russian Law
 List of Russian legal historians
 Constitution of Russia
 Civil Code of Russia
 Copyright in Russia
 Criminal Code of Russia
 Law of the Soviet Union
 Judicial system of the Russian Empire
 Sudebnik
 Garant database of Russian legislation
 Consultant Plus database of Russian legislation
 Scholars in Russian law

References

External links
  — Documents of the President of Russia 
  — Documents of the Government of Russia 
  — Normative legal acts of the Russian Federation from the Ministry of Justice of the Russian Federation 
  — Official Russian internet portal for legal information 
 Russian Private Law — A blog in English on Russian private law problems
 Legal Research Guide: Russia from the Library of Congress
With its Light and Dark Sides; The Unique Semi-Presidential System of the Russian Federation, KÜRESEL SİYASET MERKEZİ